The 1947 Rice Owls football team was an American football that represented Rice University in the Southwest Conference during the 1947 college football season. In its eighth season under head coach Jess Neely, the team compiled a 6–3–1 record (4–2 against conference opponents), finished third in the conference, was ranked No. 18 in the final AP Poll, and outscored opponents by a total of 202 to 74. The played its home games at Rice Field in Houston.

Quarterback Tobin Rote led the team on offense.  Two Rice players received first-team honors from the Associated Press on the 1947 All-Southwest Conference football team: center Joe Watson and guard J.W. Magee.

Schedule

References

Rice
Rice Owls football seasons
Rice Owls football